Star Wars: Racer Arcade is a 2000 arcade racing game developed by AM5 and LucasArts and is the final Star Wars game released by Sega. It is based on the Podrace scenes in the 1999 film Star Wars: Episode I – The Phantom Menace.

Gameplay

Racer Arcade features four tracks: Tatooine Bantha Tracks (Easy), Etti IV Smuggler's Cove (Normal), Malastare Pixelito Challenge (Hard), which has four laps, and Tatooine Boonta Eve Classic (Expert), which has three laps. Four Podracer pilots are playable: Anakin Skywalker, Ben Quadinaros, Gasgano and Sebulba. The player controls the podracer via two handheld throttle controls, similar to how pods are controlled in the film. Unlike the home console video game Star Wars Episode I: Racer, the player's podracer is indestructible, although it can suffer slowdown from collision damage, and it is possible, yet difficult, to destroy opposing podracers.

Development and release
The game was unveiled at ATEI in London in 2000.
It was available in multiple configurations, one of which was a twin type; two individual games joined in the center. The deluxe cabinet featured a 50" screen and was molded to appear like the cockpit of Anakin Skywalker's podracer. Up to four cabinets could be linked for multiplayer.

Reception 
In Japan, Game Machine listed Star Wars: Racer Arcade on their August 15, 2000 issue as being the fifth most-successful dedicated arcade game of the month. In a 2020 retrospective, Kotaku's Lewis Packwood called the arcade game a "beefier, fancier-looking version of Episode I: Racer."

See also
 Star Wars Trilogy Arcade
 Star Wars Battle Pod

References

External links

2000 video games
Racer Arcade
Racer Arcade
Racing video games
Sega arcade games
Star Wars: Episode I – The Phantom Menace video games
LucasArts games
Arcade video games
Arcade-only video games
Video games developed in Japan